Turiška Vas na Pohorju is a small village in the Pohorje Hills in the Municipality of Slovenska Bistrica in northeastern Slovenia. The area is part of the traditional region of Styria. It is now included with the rest of the municipality in the Drava Statistical Region.

Name
The name of the settlement was changed from Turiška vas to Turiška vas na Pohorju in 1955.

Cultural heritage
A small roadside chapel-shrine in the village dates to the early 20th century.

References

External links
Turiška Vas na Pohorju at Geopedia

Populated places in the Municipality of Slovenska Bistrica